Ron Chiodi (born November 24, 1974) is an American former snowboarder. He attended high school in Fairport, New York, where he first gained attention as a pole valuter.  He later turned to snowboarding, competing in the sport from 1996 to 2003. He competed in the men's halfpipe event at the 1998 Winter Olympics.

References

External links
 

1974 births
Living people
American male snowboarders
Olympic snowboarders of the United States
Snowboarders at the 1998 Winter Olympics
People from Fairport, New York
20th-century American people
21st-century American people